Lucien Saulnier,  (July 25, 1916 – June 22, 1989) was a Canadian politician. He was chair of the Montreal Urban Community during the October Crisis. He was also Chairman and Chief Executive Officer of the Société de développement industriel du Québec.

Saulnier was elected to the Montreal City Council in 1954, working with the Ligue d'Action Civique. In 1960, he co-founded Montreal's Civic Party with Jean Drapeau. From 1960 to 1969, Saulnier was the chair of the executive committee and was head of the Montreal Urban Community.

In 1972, he left politics and held positions with public agencies including Hydro-Québec.

In 1971 he was made a Companion of the Order of Canada "for services rendered as an administrator".

References

1916 births
1989 deaths
Companions of the Order of Canada
Montreal city councillors